Daniel Ripić (born 14 March 1996) is an Austrian professional footballer who is currently a free agent.

Career
Ripić is the product of the Red Bull Salzburg academy, playing his first seasons of senior football for Red Bull's farm team FC Liefering. For the 2015–16 season Ripić moved to VfB Stuttgart II.

After scoring two goals in only six matches during his two seasons at VfB Stuttgart's third-tier reserve team Ripić terminated his contract in the summer of 2017, his next station being NK Osijek.

International career
Ripić was born in Austria and is of Croatian descent. He is a youth international for Austria.

References

External links 

 
 Daniel Ripić at Union Henndorf

1996 births
Place of birth missing (living people)
Living people
Austrian footballers
Austria youth international footballers
Austrian people of Croatian descent
Austrian expatriate footballers
FC Liefering players
VfB Stuttgart II players
Expatriate footballers in Germany
3. Liga players
Association football forwards
People from Spittal an der Drau
Footballers from Carinthia (state)